The Wycombe by-election of 4 November 1952 was held after Conservative Member of Parliament (MP) Hon. William Astor succeeded to the peerage. The seat was retained by the Conservative candidate John Hall.

Results

References

1952 elections in the United Kingdom
1952 in England
20th century in Buckinghamshire
By-elections to the Parliament of the United Kingdom in Buckinghamshire constituencies
Wycombe District
November 1952 events in the United Kingdom